August 2022 Kabul bombing may refer to: 

5 August 2022 Kabul bombing
August 2022 Kabul mosque bombing, which happened on 17 August